Opwijk is a municipality located in the Belgian province of Flemish Brabant. The municipality comprises the towns of Mazenzele and Opwijk proper. On January 1, 2012, Opwijk had a total population of 13,990. The total area is 19.69 km² which gives a population density of 690 inhabitants per km².

References

External links
 
Official website - Available only in Dutch
Heemkring Opwijk-Mazenzele - Available only in Dutch

Municipalities of Flemish Brabant